Herbert Miller Greene (1871 – February 8, 1932) was an American architect. He designed the Dallas National Bank Building and a number of buildings for the University of Texas at Austin.

Greene was born in Huntington, Pennsylvania, and was educated at the University of Illinois.

References
Handbook of Texas Online bio

External links

GREENE, HERBERT MILLER

Architects from Texas
University of Texas at Austin people
University of Illinois School of Architecture alumni
1871 births
1932 deaths